Melanella alba is a species of sea snail, a marine gastropod mollusk in the family Eulimidae. The species is one of many species known to exist within the genus Melanella.

Description

The measured length of a typical shell of this species generally ranges from approximately 10 mm to as large as 19 mm.

Distribution

This species occurs in the following locations:

 Belgian Exclusive Economic Zone
 British Isles
 European waters (ERMS scope)
 Irish Exclusive Economic Zone
 Mediterranean Sea
 North East Atlantic
 Norwegian Exclusive Economic Zone
 Portuguese Exclusive Economic Zone
 Spanish Exclusive Economic Zone
 Swedish Exclusive Economic Zone
 United Kingdom Exclusive Economic Zone
 Wimereux

References

External links
 To World Register of Marine Species

alba
Gastropods described in 1778
Taxa named by Emanuel Mendes da Costa